Uwe Grodd (born 29 November 1958 in Stuttgart) is a German conductor and flautist, currently living in Auckland (New Zealand).

He has performed and recorded internationally for over 25 years. Grodd conducted the gala opening night of the Handel Festival in Halle in Germany of 2003 with "Le Choeur des Musiciens du Louvre" from Grenoble followed by a highly successful season of Händel's rediscovered opera, Imeneo in the Halle Opera House. His appointment to conduct the Auckland Choral Society (Auckland Choral) was confirmed at Holy Trinity Cathedral, Auckland, on 28 September 2008, in a concert that concluded with Anton Bruckner's Locus iste, Handel's Coronation Anthems and "David Roi".

Discography 
 Joseph Haydn: Trios for flute, cello and piano Hob. XV:15-17 - Christopher Hinterhuber, piano; Martin Rummel, cello - Naxos 8.572667 (2011)

External links 
 Personal website of Uwe Grodd
 Uwe Grodd biography and discography at Naxos.com

German male conductors (music)
German classical flautists
1958 births
Living people
German music educators
Academic staff of the University of Auckland
21st-century German conductors (music)
21st-century German male musicians
21st-century flautists